The pale-lipped shadeskink (Saproscincus basiliscus) is a species of skink found in Queensland, Australia.

References

Saproscincus
Reptiles described in 1981
Skinks of Australia
Endemic fauna of Australia
Taxa named by Glen Joseph Ingram
Taxa named by Peter Alan Rawlinson